Constantine J. Hering (January 1, 1800 – July 23, 1880) was a physician who was an early pioneer of homeopathy in the United States.

Biography
Hering was born in Oschatz, and studied medicine at the University of Leipzig where his interest in homeopathy began. He had been engaged to write a book confuting homeopathy, but upon reading Samuel Hahnemann's works and investigating homeopathy's clinical claims for himself he became convinced of its efficacy, sought out the author, and became his personal friend.  They began corresponding in 1824. Later, Hering was treated for a dissecting wound with the homeopathic remedy Arsenicum album (white arsenic or arsenic trioxide) and the finger was saved, further provoking his interest.

He was for a time instructor in mathematics and natural science in Blochmann's Institute, Dresden. Following his graduation from the University of Würzburg in 1826 he received a commission from the King of Saxony to travel to Surinam on a natural history expedition. He settled there for a number of years and commenced practice before emigrating to Pennsylvania in January 1833.

He was one of the pioneers of homeopathy in the United States of America and helped to disseminate homeopathy there. He founded a homeopathic school, the first of its kind in any country. From 1845 until 1869 he filled the chairs of institutes of medicine and materia medica in the Philadelphia College of Homeopathy. He devoted much study to cures for the bites of venomous serpents and for hydrophobia, and developed many of Hahnemann's theories.

He introduced a number of homeopathic remedies to the materia medica, including Lachesis, Psorinum and Glonoinum.

Family
His father was the German composer . His nephew was the physiologist Ewald Hering.
One of his sons was Walter E. Hering, the founder of Globe Ticket Company, the oldest ticket company in the United States.  Another of his sons was Hermann S. Hering, who, for a time, lectured and conducted research at Johns Hopkins University, and later became a prominent figure in the Christian Science church.  Hermann Hering was a practitioner, teacher, and lecturer of Christian Science.  He served a term of president of the church and as the appointed First Reader of The First Church of Christ, Scientist, in Boston, and later of the Christian Science church in Concord, NH.

Also Carl Hering (1860 – 1926) was one of his sons. Carl was an American engineer involved in studies on electric batteries and electric furnaces. He also made discoveries on electromagnetic force and wrote a book about his father.

Works
He was the author of a number of important homeopathic works, including the 10-volume Guiding Symptoms, which he did not live to complete. He was joint editor of the Medical Correspondent (Allentown, 1835–1836), of the Miscellanies of Homeopathy (Philadelphia, 1839), of the North American Homœopathic Quarterly (New York, 1851–1852), and of the Homœopathic News (1854), and founded and edited the American Journal of Homœopathic Materia Medica. He published many books in both German and English, including:
 Rise and Progress of Homoeopathy (Philadelphia, 1834), which was translated into several languages
 The homoeopathist (1835-1838) (Digital German edition by the University and State Library Düsseldorf)
 Condensed Materia Medica (1837)
 Effects of Snake Poison (1837) / Wirkungen des Schlangengiftes . Blumer, Allentaun [Pa.] 1837 Digital edition by the University and State Library Düsseldorf
 Guiding Symptoms and Analytical Therapeutics
 Domestic Physician (1851)
 American Drug Provings (vol. i., Leipsic, 1853)

Notes

References
 Winston, Julian. The Faces of Homeopathy. Tawa: Great Auk Publishing, 1999.

External links
 

American homeopaths
1800 births
1880 deaths
Leipzig University alumni
University of Würzburg alumni
German emigrants to the United States